Marco Fioravanti (born 18 March 1983 in Ascoli Piceno) is an Italian politician.

Formerly member of centre-right party The People of Freedom, he joined Brothers of Italy in 2013. He served as member of the City Council of Ascoli from 2009 to 2019.

Fioravanti ran for Mayor of Ascoli Piceno at the 2019 local elections, supported by a Center-right coalition formed by Brothers of Italy, Lega Nord and local civic lists. He won and took office on 11 June 2019.

References

External links 

1983 births
Living people
21st-century Italian politicians
Mayors of Ascoli Piceno
People from Ascoli Piceno